Abdul Munim is a Pakistani politician hailing from Nimkalay, Shangla District. He is currently serving as a Special Assistants in Tourism Department and a member of the Khyber Pakhtunkhwa Assembly belong to the Pakistan Tehreek-e-Insaf.

He was disqualified to hold public office by the Supreme Court of Pakistan in February 2018.

References

Living people
Pashtun people
Khyber Pakhtunkhwa MPAs 2013–2018
People from Shangla District
Pakistan Tehreek-e-Insaf politicians
Year of birth missing (living people)